Callee Wilkerson (October 2, 1990) is an American retired professional wrestler, known by her ring names Barbi Hayden and Abilene Maverick. She is a one-time NWA World Women's Champion. She is best known for her frequent work in ACW, the NWA, and WOW.

Professional wrestling career 
In year 2010 Barbi Hayden made her debut and on June 1, 2013 at Ring of Honor she debuted in a one on one match against Athena Reese but was not successful.

On January 25, 2014, Hayden won the NWA World Women's Championship for the first time, after defeating Kacee Carlisle. She made her first successful title defense on February 8 against Santana Garrett at WSU Mutiny. Hayden held the title 378 days, when she successfully defended the title eleven times, before losing the title to Garrett on February 7, 2015.

On July 31, 2015, Hayden lost to Tessa Blanchard in the first women's match to ever be televised in China. On January 21, 2016 Hayden made her debut for Shine Wrestling at SHINE 32, defeating Renee Michelle. The following month on February 26, at SHINE 33 Hayden defeated Leah Vaughan.

Hayden appeared at TNA One Night Only: Knockouts Knockdown 2016 Pay Per View. At this event, Hayden defeated Raquel in a singles qualifying match, for a spot in the Queen of the Knockouts Gauntlet Battle Royal. Facing Jade, Allysin Kay, Allie, Madison Rayne and Marti Belle and Rebel and Rosemary, which was won by Jade.

Hayden joined Women of Wrestling (WOW) under the name Abilene Maverick, The Governor’s Daughter. After debuting as a face, Maverick began turning heel and started to bully Stephy Slays, committing acts such as spilling tea on her, and feigning an injury to avoid facing her in the ring. Following Slays' victory over The Disciplinarian, the evil Maverick attacked Slays backstage, cementing her heel turn.

On July 22, 2019, Hayden announced her retirement from pro wrestling to focus on performing stage shows in Las Vegas. She had already filmed for season 2 of WOW which will air later in the year as her final matches.

Championships and accomplishments 

ACW American Joshi Championship (1 time)
ACW Televised Championship (1 time)
National Wrestling Alliance
NWA World Women's Championship (1 time)
Lone Star Championship Wrestling
NWA Lonestar Women's Championship (4 times)
NWA Texoma
NWA Texoma Women's Championship (1 time)
Pro Wrestling Illustrated
 Ranked No. 12 of the best 50 female singles wrestlers in the PWI Female 50 in 2014

References

External links

1990 births
Living people
People from College Station, Texas
American female professional wrestlers
Professional wrestlers from Texas
21st-century American women
21st-century professional wrestlers
NWA World Women's Champions